Serrastretta is a town and comune in the province of Catanzaro in the Calabria region of southern Italy.

The town is bordered by Amato, Decollatura, Feroleto Antico, Lamezia Terme, Miglierina, Pianopoli, Platania and San Pietro Apostolo.

History 
Serrastretta was founded by Jewish refugees fleeing the Inquisition and was historically home to a notable Jewish community. Several families of Ukrainian Jewish refugees were invited into the town in 2022, in hope to help restore the remaining Jewish presence in Serrastretta.

The Ner Tamid del Sud shul is the only operating synagogue in Calabria.

Economy
Serrastretta is a center of production of furniture, kitchens, door-frames, casings and furnishings of every kind. Above all are the  woven-straw chairs, for which Serrastretta is considered to be one of the main Calabrese producers. The chair makers continue to construct chairs as in the past - a frame made of wood, to which the women expertly apply the woven straw seats with a special bush "vuda", coming from the plants in the marshlands.

In the territory of Serrastretta also porcini mushrooms are found, particularly in areas where chestnut trees grow. There is also a museum devoted to the  singer Dalida, whose parents originally came from Serrastretta.

References

External links
Official website

Cities and towns in Calabria